Nekhayevsky (masculine), Nekhayevskaya (feminine), or Nekhayevksoye (neuter) may refer to:
Nekhayevsky District, a district of Volgograd Oblast, Russia
Nekhayevskaya, a rural locality (a stanitsa) in Nekhayevsky District of Volgograd Oblast, Russia